The discography of Japanese recording artist Gackt consists of eight studio albums, eight compilation albums, one extended play, and forty-eight singles. In 1999 Gackt signed a recording contract with Nippon Crown. His breakthrough success was the EP Mizérable, which peaked at number 2 on the Oricon albums chart. His single "Returner (Yami no Shūen)", released on June 20, 2007, was his first and only single to reach the number one spot on the Oricon charts to date. In 2007, his entire back catalogue, with live song recordings from Drug Party tour, was released on the iTunes Store, video collection "The Greatest Filmography" was released in the United States and Canada, and his album Diabolos was released in 18 European countries. From November 2008 until March 2010 his records were released under his own independent label Dears, but still supported by Nippon Crown. In April 2010, Gackt transferred to Avex Group. Since February 2014 they're released by his independent record label G&Lovers, which is supported by Crown Tokuma. As a solo artist, since 2009 are reported sales of over 10 million, and holds the male soloist record for most top ten consecutive chart singles as of July 18, 2011.

Discography

Studio albums

Footnotes:
 — = N/A

Live albums

Compilation albums

Remix albums

Soundtrack

Singles

 On December 27, 2006, Japanese recording charts Oricon wrote up the list of Gackt's top ten best selling singles. The sales can be seen in the table, from first: "Another World", "Vanilla", "Jūnigatsu no Love Song", "Metamorphoze", "Kimi no Tameni Dekiru Koto", "Wasurenai Kara", "Oasis", "Redemption", "Kimi ni Aitakute", and "Mizérable".

Credited work
Covers
1997 - Hideki Saijo's "Kizudarake no Lola" as a vocalist.
2000 - Stevie Wonder's "To Feel the Fire" as part of Kirin's Fire brand of coffee campaign.
2003 - John Lennon's "Love", performed at the "Dream Power: John Lennon Super Live" concert organized by Yoko Ono in Saitama Super Arena.
2016 - Ayumi Hamasaki's "Seasons" as part of Nescafé Dolce Gusto brand of coffee campaign.
2017 - Dreams Come True's "Suki" released in The Best Covers Of Dreams Come True Doriuta Vol.1. (2017).
Many songs during the cover concert festival conceptualized around fictional school "Camui Gakuen" held since 2009.

Other contribution
2006 - Ji Dandi "Lover 〜愛しい人〜" (songwriter, composer)
2008 - Tōru Furuya "ララの夜想曲-nocturne-" (composer)
2014 - Mayo Kawasaki "Why" (supplemental songwriter, composer)
 2019 - BoA "スキだよ-MY LOVE-" (lyricist)

Video discography

Concert tour videos

Concert tour videos compilations

Music videos compilations

Video singles

Platinum Box series

References

Discographies of Japanese artists
Pop music discographies